Live at the Royal Albert Hall is a live album and video album by English singer-songwriter Adele, which became available on 29 November 2011 in Australia, 27 November 2011 in the United Kingdom and 29 November 2011 in the United States. The concert was recorded as part of Adele's Adele Live tour at the Royal Albert Hall in London, including songs from her global best-sellers 19 and 21.

On 26 October 2011, it was announced Adele would be releasing her Royal Albert Hall concert from her Adele Live tour on both DVD and Blu-ray along with an accompanying CD. The release included 90 minutes of concert footage in addition to behind-the-scenes video segments. The track list consists of songs taken from Adele's 19 and 21 as well as covers of Bonnie Raitt's "I Can't Make You Love Me" and The SteelDrivers' "If It Hadn't Been for Love". As part of the launch, the DVD was screened at cinemas in 26 cities around the world.

Live at the Royal Albert Hall holds the record for the most weeks spent at number one in the United States for a music DVD by a female artist, and has sold more than three million copies worldwide. The live version of "Set Fire to the Rain" taken from the special won the Grammy Award for Best Pop Solo Performance at the 55th ceremony in 2013.

Critical reception

Live at the Royal Albert Hall was well received by music critics. At Metacritic, which assigns a normalised rating out of 100 to reviews from mainstream critics, the album received an average score of 76, based on 5 reviews, which indicates "generally favorable reviews".

The Boston Globe labeled the release "Our DVD pick" and said, "the performances are routinely inspired. With the voice of an angel – and the potty mouth of a sailor – she's a force throughout." In a very positive review, MTV News writes, "I actually had to remind myself not to clap at the conclusion of a couple songs... And in that regard, it is a tremendous success; you definitely get the full experience. Adele is luminous, compelling, funny and profane throughout, and like I said, her voice is in tiptop shape."

However, Maria Schurr of PopMatters was more critical. She gave the DVD a 6/10 and wrote, "Yes, her voice is unbelievable and her everygirl personality is refreshing, but musically and artistically I find her a bit dull."

Commercial performance
Live at the Royal Albert Hall debuted at number one in the United States with 96,000 copies sold, the highest one-week tally for a music DVD in four years. After one week, Live at the Royal Albert Hall became the best-selling music DVD of 2011. This makes Adele the first artist in Nielsen SoundScan history to have the year's number one album, the year's number one single, and the year's number one music DVD. In its 16th week at number one in the United States, it became the longest-running video by a female artist since Barbra Streisand's Barbra- The Concert was number one for sixteen weeks in 1996. It is the first video to spend 17 consecutive weeks at number one since Jay-Z and Linkin Park's Collision Course in 2005. In April 2012, the album topped the US charts for an 18th week, making it the longest-running music video by a British artist since Pink Floyd's Pulse in 1996. On 8 April 2012, the DVD spent its 19th consecutive week at number one in the United States, becoming the longest continuous run at number one for a music DVD since 1999. In May 2012, the DVD matched Whitney Houston's record for the most weeks spent by a music video release at number one by a female artist with 22 consecutive weeks at number one. Houston had set the record in 1986 with the release of her The #1 Video Hits video. After returning to number one the week of 16 May 2012, the DVD set the record for the most weeks spent at number one for a music DVD by a female artist with 23 weeks at number one. In May 2013, the DVD logged its 28th week on top of the chart, extending its record for the longest-running #1 music video by a female artist.

Midway through 2012, Live at the Royal Albert Hall was the best-selling music DVD in the United States with sales of 464,000 in the first six months of 2012 alone and bringing its total US sales to 915,000. This is more than any music video has sold in the first half of a year since Jay-Z and Linkin Park's Collision Course in 2005. By late August 2012, Live at the Royal Albert Hall had sold 955,000 copies in the United States.

As of 28 November 2012, Live at the Royal Albert Hall had surpassed sales of one million copies in the United States and sales of three million copies worldwide. Live at the Royal Albert Hall is the first music DVD to surpass sales of one million in the USA since Eagles' Farewell 1 Tour-Live from Melbourne in 2005 (Garth Brooks' The Ultimate Hits sold one million copies in 2007, but was a CD/DVD combination). In 2014, the Brazilian Association of Record Producers (ABPD), granted to sixfold Diamond to Live at the Royal Albert Hall for its sales over 1 million copies in Brazil.

Accolades

Broadcasts
Live at the Royal Albert Hall made its television debut on SABC3 in South Africa on 31 December 2011. It then aired on BBC One in the United Kingdom on 1 January 2012 in an abbreviated version. The video made its French television debut on NRJ Hits on 2 March 2012 in an abbreviated version. It was repeated on BBC One on Wednesday 4 April 2012. A red button feature included the 'You, Me and Albert' behind the scenes footage that was seen on the DVD with "I Can't Make You Love Me" following. The set list on the abbreviated version was:

 "Hometown Glory"
 "I'll Be Waiting"
 "Don't You Remember"
 "Turning Tables"
 "Set Fire to the Rain"
 "My Same"
 "Rumour Has It"
 "Chasing Pavements"
 "Make You Feel My Love"
 "Someone like You"
 "Rolling in the Deep"

Therefore, the cut songs were "If It Hadn't Been for Love", "Take It All", "Right as Rain", "One and Only", "Lovesong" and "I Can't Make You Love Me".

Adele Live in London with Matt Lauer
On 3 June 2012, NBC aired a special titled Adele Live in London with Matt Lauer. The special combined performances from Live at the Royal Albert Hall with an exclusive interview with Adele given by Matt Lauer. Adele Live in London with Matt Lauer was the top-rated program of its hour and helped NBC win the night. The TV special and its success helped revitalise sales for 21. Adele Live in London with Matt Lauer included seven performances from Live at the Royal Albert Hall: "Set Fire to the Rain", "Chasing Pavements", "Someone like You", "Rolling in the Deep", "Turning Tables", "I'll Be Waiting", and "Hometown Glory".

Track listing

Personnel
Credits adapted from the album liner notes:

Adele – lead vocals
Paul Dugdale – director
Ben Thomas – guitar
Tim Van Der Kuil – guitar
Miles Robertson – keys
Sam Dixon – bass
Derrick Wright – drums
Kelli-Leigh Henry-Davila – backing vocals
Sharleen Linton – backing vocals
Rosie Danvers – cello
Bryony James – cello

Becky Jones – viola
Sarah Chapman – viola
Hayley Pomfrett – violin
Sally Jackson – violin
Kotono Sato – violin
Jo Allen – violin
Ellie Stamford – violin
Stephanie Cavey – violin
Jenny Sacha – violin
Ana Croad – violin

Charts

Year-end charts

Certifications and sales

!scope="col" colspan="3" | CD
|-

!scope="col" colspan="3" | DVD
|-

References

2011 live albums
2011 video albums
Adele live albums
Adele video albums
Columbia Records live albums
Columbia Records video albums
Live albums recorded at the Royal Albert Hall
Live video albums
Sony Music live albums
Sony Music video albums
XL Recordings live albums
XL Recordings video albums